Krasny Kamysh is a rural locality (a khutor) in Soldatsky Selsoviet Rural Settlement, Fatezhsky District, Kursk Oblast, Russia. Population:

Geography 
The khutor is located on the Ruda River (a link tributary of the Usozha in the basin of the Svapa), 95 km from the Russia–Ukraine border, 44 km north-west of Kursk, 8.5 km south-west of the district center – the town Fatezh, 5 km from the selsoviet center – Soldatskoye.

 Climate
Krasny Kamysh has a warm-summer humid continental climate (Dfb in the Köppen climate classification).

Transport 
Krasny Kamysh is located 7 km from the federal route  Crimea Highway as part of the European route E105, 8 km from the road of regional importance  (Fatezh – Dmitriyev), 2.5 km from the road of intermunicipal significance  (38K-038 – Soldatskoye – Shuklino), 31.5 km from the nearest railway halt 29 km (railway line Arbuzovo – Luzhki-Orlovskiye).

The rural locality is situated 47 km from Kursk Vostochny Airport, 163 km from Belgorod International Airport and 240 km from Voronezh Peter the Great Airport.

References

Notes

Sources

Rural localities in Fatezhsky District